Comau (COnsorzio MAcchine Utensili) is an Italian multinational company in the automation field based in Turin, Italy, and part of the automaker Stellantis. The company is present in 13 countries and employs 4,000 people and provides services, products and technologies for automotive industry, shipping industry, logistics, food and beverage industry, packaging, electrification, renewable energy and heavy industry.

History

Foundation 
Comau began in 1973 as the COnsorzio MAcchine Utensili. It was formed by the same Torino-based engineers and companies that helped build the landmark Volga Automobile Plant in Russia. In 1977 it was later renamed Comau Finanziaria S.p.A.

Growth and expansion
In 1984, Comau Productivity Systems Inc. was formed.

It started development of commercial and industrial activities in North America. Comau Finanziaria S.p.A. gained a majority interest in Italtech S.p.A..

The following year, it acquired Berto Lamet, a sheet metal die producer, and U.T.S., which specialized in product and process engineering. Berto Lamet then took over TEA, an injection molds manufacturer and, in 1990, it took over the Spanish company, Mecaner S.A., which specialized in producing sheet metal dies.

In 1995, the company grew throughout South America, Europe, North America and Asia. Comau do Brasil Ind e Com. Ltda and Comau Argentina S.A. were launched with all Comau Business Units joining the Mercosur market. In Germany, Comau Deutschland GmbH was established.

In 1996, a French branch was formed. The company officially changes its name, it become Comau S.p.A.

In 1997, the company gained a majority interest in Geico S.p.A., a producer of painting systems within the automotive industry. Comau India Pvt. Ltd. in Pune was set up as the company's headquarters in Southeast Asia. Comau Poland Sp.z.o.o., a production plant for sheet metal dies, began operation in Tychy and, later that year, began offering maintenance services as well. In the same year, Comau Service was launched to provide full maintenance services to customers worldwide.

In 1999, Comau took over the French company Sciaky S.A., a producer of body systems and welding guns, which was renamed Comau Sciaky S.A. Also that year, Comau S.p.A. gained a majority interest in Renault Automation S.A. of France, a company specializing in engineering, metal cutting, mechanical assembly and body final assembly. In the same year, Fiat S.p.A. acquired Progressive Tool and Industries Co. (PICO), a U.S. company experienced in body systems manufacturing, and was subsequently renamed Comau Pico. In the UK, the Pico Estil in Luton became Comau Estil; in South Africa, Aims in Uitenhage was renamed Comau South Africa Pty. Ltd.

In 2000, Comau Automotive Equipment Colt., was opened in Shanghai, Comau Belgium N.V. was established to develop maintenance services in Northern Europe and Comau Systems Services S.L. began operations in Madrid.

The next year, Comau S.p.A. acquired two companies in automotive product and process engineering and industrialization, Germann-Intec GmbH and Team Resources Romania, which became Comau România S.A. Comau Australia opens in Adelaide in 2001.

In 2002, Comau Ingest Sverige AB was established in Sweden; in 2003, Comau Russia Srl and Comau (Shanghai) International Trading Co. Ltd. began operations with a focus on import-export activities. Comau Sciaky SA became the full owner of Gerbi & Sciaky, a company in France that produces electrical welding guns, changing its name to Sciaky S.A.S. in 2004.
The next year, Comau Service France and Comau Sciaky and Sciaky S.A.S. were consolidated within Comau France S.A. In 2005, Comau Germann-Intec GmbH merges with Comau Deutschland GmbH.

In 2007, Comau-Germann Intec GmbH was started in Germany with a focus on engineering activities.
In 2013, Comau expanded its presence in China with three new sites. Comau Turkey and Comau Czech are also opened to better serve the Middle and Eastern European markets. Soon after, Comau establishes a new office in Munich, Germany and expands into Mexico.

Comau São Paulo and Comau Thailand are established in 2015, while in 2016, Comau opened its HUMANufacturing Innovation Center in Pontedera (Pisa), Italy. The company also opens a new location in California, United States, in 2016. Comau expands its activities in the United Kingdom in 2017, by opening a new engineering facility in North East England.

In these years the Comau Academy is founded, with which the company began to organize master, technical and managerial training courses, and then with the educational platform e.DO™ Experience Comau began to offer educational activities for learning STEM subjects, robotics, coding and soft skills based on the use of educational and open source robots and.DO™.

In 2020 Comau signed the technological collaboration agreement with TIM for the digital transformation of the manufacturing industries and collaborated with FCA and the Fiat brand in the production of the new electrical Fiat 500, supported SME manufacturing companies at the MADE competence center in Milan, cooperated with the Artes 4.0 in Pisa, collaborated with the CIM 4.0 in Turin and joined the Innovation Community EIT Manufacturing.

In 2021 the company joined the European Battery Alliance (Eba) and the Batteries European Partnership Association (Bepa), contributed to the European Technology & Innovation Platform (Etip) for batteries, collaborated with the UK Battery Industrialisation Center, with Rockwell Automation for the creation of unified robot control solutions, with Fincantieri to develop prototypes of robotized steel welding solutions and with Ilika plc.

During the Italian Tech Week in Turin  September 2021  the company was praised by the CEO and founder of Tesla Elon Musk for the support provided by Comau between 2017 and 2019 in the construction of the assembly lines for the production of Model 3.

In 2022 Comau collaborated to expand the manufacturing lines in the Brazilian state of Pernambuco to produce the new 7-seat Jeep Commander SUV to  increase process optimization and control, and supported Ilika in a study for All-Solid-State Battery Technology.

New Leadership
In June 2020 Alessandro Nasi was selected Chairman of Comau, with Paolo Carmassi as CEO.

In April 2022 Comau announced the appointment of Pietro Gorlier as the new CEO.

Products, technologies and services

Body assembly
Production of:

 assembly and welding systems for car bodies, frames and components;
 junction technologies (e.g. laser and plasma cutting, welding clamps, point welding machines, brazing applications).

Powertrain and machining
Analysis, development, industrialization, design and supply of technologies for mechanical processing in manufacturing sectors:

 integrated universal machining centers Iot (Industrial Internet of Things);
 flexible systems;
 production lines;
 crankshaft machines;
 thermal spray coating.

Technologies for automotive and transport sector.

Robotics and automation products
Robotics products since 1978.

In 1979 the company built the first robotic assembly line, which was supplied to the Fiat plant in Mirafiori for the production of the famous car model FIAT 131.

In the late '70s and early '80s Comau started to produce the first industrial robots and launched the Robogate system on the European and world market - an assembly system designed to carry out multiple operations at the same time with the joint use of several robots.

In the second half of the 80s, as a massive development of laser technology begins, Comau started to design laser robots.

In the following years other robots and automation products were developed:
 anthropomorphic robots for different industrial applications (SCARA robotics arms, robots for special processing, hollow wrist);
 collaborative robots to work in close contact with humans (Racer-5-0.80 COBOT, AURA,);
 exoskeleton to support the upper limbs of operators to facilitate their work and reduce physical fatigue (MATE-XT);
 Automatic Guided Vehicle (AGV) to manage logistics more easily within the factory (Agile 1500);
 educational robots designed to facilitate the learning and teaching of STEM subjects, robotics, coding and enhancing soft skills (e.DO);
 factory automation products 4.0 (Lhyte, the hybrid laser system that combines fiber and diode laser sources, a wide range of welding pliers and the Spot Welding Machine, a special robot integrated with a point welding clamp).

Electrification
Development of products and automation processes for electrification, from mechanical machining centers and assembly systems to digital products for Industry 4.0 and integrated logistics services: production and assembly of rechargeable modules and batteries, up to electric motors.

Collaboration on the Flexible Battery Dismantling (Flex-BD) project to automate all battery dismantling operations.

Other services 
Services for production processes, concept development, plant design, improvement of production processes, project management, system integration services  and services for industrial.

Presence
Comau's headquarters are in Turin, Italy, and the company is present in 14 countries around the world – spread over Europe, Asia, South America and North America – with 7 innovation centres, 5 digital hub and 8 production plants, where over 9.000 people work.

Key People
• Alessandro Nasi, Chairman  in 2005 he joined the Fiat Group, following professional experiences in the banking and finance sector. He held senior roles at Fiat Powertrain Technologies and CNH Industrial, a company that produces machinery for agriculture and construction. Currently he is member of the Board of Directors of CNH Industrial, Chairman of Iveco Defence Vehicles and member of the Lego Group's advisory board. Nasi is also vice-chairman of the Board of EXOR.

• Pietro Gorlier, CEO. He was Chief Parts and Services Officer worldwide at Stellantis, President and CEO of MOPAR, CEO of Magneti Marelli, COO of the Region EMEA at FCA and since 2011 he has been a member of the FCA Group Executive Council (GEC).

Corporate structure
As part of Stellantis, Comau is managed by a board of directors and a board of statutory auditors. The board of directors oversees the company's performance both directly and through committees charged with specific advisory functions. It is supported by a body made up of members.

Shareholdings
Comau is a wholly owned subsidiary of the Stellantis Group.

References

Stellantis
Engineering companies of Italy
Robotics companies
Technology companies established in 1973
Italian companies established in 1973
Manufacturing companies based in Turin
Italian brands